Criodion is a genus of beetles in the family Cerambycidae, containing the following species:

Species
Criodion angustatum Buquet, 1852
Criodion antennatum Gahan, 1892
Criodion cinereum (Olivier, 1795)
Criodion dejeani Gahan, 1892
Criodion fulvopilosum Gahan, 1892
Criodion murinum Nonfried, 1895
Criodion pilosum Lucas, 1857
Criodion rhinoceros Bates, 1870
Criodion subpubescens Martins & Monne, 2005
Criodion tomentosum Audinet-Serville, 1833
Criodion torticolle Bates, 1870
Criodion tuberculatum Gahan, 1892

Names brought to synonymy
Criodion elegans, a synonym for Poeciloxestia elegans

References

External links 
 

Cerambycini
Cerambycidae genera